Kirkwood is a town in Broome County, New York, United States. The population was 5,495 at the 2020 census. The town is named after James P. Kirkwood, who was an engineer responsible for constructing the local railroad.

The town is in the south-central part of the county, southeast of Binghamton.

History 

Circa 1781, Jonathan Fitch built a gristmill here, becoming the first pioneer settler. The Town of Kirkwood was formed from the town of Conklin in 1859.

In 2006 and 2011, parts of the town were damaged when the Susquehanna River overflowed its banks.

Geography

The southern town line is the state line of Pennsylvania (Susquehanna County).

The Susquehanna River forms the western border. U.S. Route 11 and Interstate 81 pass through the town, following the course of the Susquehanna. Interstate 86/New York State Route 17 passes across the north part of the town.

Demographics

As of the census of 2000, there were 5,651 people, 2,247 households, and 1,611 families residing in the town.  The population density was 182.5 people per square mile (70.5/km2).  There were 2,469 housing units at an average density of 79.7 per square mile (30.8/km2).  The racial makeup of the town was 97.75% White, 0.60% African American, 0.18% Native American, 0.39% Asian, 0.02% Pacific Islander, 0.16% from other races, and 0.90% from two or more races. Hispanic or Latino of any race were 0.64% of the population.

There were 2,247 households, out of which 31.3% had children under the age of 18 living with them, 57.5% were married couples living together, 9.8% had a female householder with no husband present, and 28.3% were non-families. 22.4% of all households were made up of individuals, and 9.2% had someone living alone who was 65 years of age or older.  The average household size was 2.51 and the average family size was 2.92.

In the town, the population was spread out, with 24.0% under the age of 18, 7.0% from 18 to 24, 28.9% from 25 to 44, 25.2% from 45 to 64, and 15.0% who were 65 years of age or older.  The median age was 39 years. For every 100 females, there were 99.5 males.  For every 100 females age 18 and over, there were 96.4 males.

The median income for a household in the town was $38,279, and the median income for a family was $45,993. Males had a median income of $34,543 versus $23,275 for females. The per capita income for the town was $19,228.  About 4.0% of families and 5.9% of the population were below the poverty line, including 8.3% of those under age 18 and 5.2% of those age 65 or over.

Windsor Central School District is the primary school district in Kirkwood among other towns including Windsor and West Windsor.
Susquehanna Valley Central School District encompasses the southernmost part of Kirkwood as well as the town of Conklin and the town of Binghamton.

Communities 
Kirkwood is located in the central part of Broome County, geographically adjacent to the northeast bank of the Susquehanna River. The town's boundaries extend from the Binghamton city limits on the north, to the Pennsylvania border on the south.

Kirkwood's hamlets and their locations within town boundaries (from north to south) are:

Popes Ravine – Northwest Kirkwood, along the Susquehanna River and bordering the city of Binghamton.
Brookvale (formerly "Stanley Hollow") – Northeast Kirkwood, on County Road 52. This hamlet is no longer formally recognized, but Brookvale remains a landmark community within town.
Five Mile Point – North of Kirkwood Center, nearest the junction of I-81 and NY 17. Named due to its location, five miles from Binghamton's Broome County Courthouse.
Kirkwood Center (also simply "Kirkwood") – Small, geographical center of town, along its western border. Located halfway between Binghamton and Kirkwood Village, and between US 11 and I-81.
Langdon – North of Kirkwood Village, on County Road 32.
Kirkwood Village – Largest hamlet within town, located along the Susquehanna River bank and US 11.
Riverside – Southernmost part of town, a mile north of the Pennsylvania border and along US 11.

References

External links
 Town of Kirkwood official website
  Early history of Kirkwood, NY

Binghamton metropolitan area
Towns in Broome County, New York